Oreolalax chuanbeiensis (Sichuan lazy toad or Chuanbei toothed toad) is a species of amphibian in the family Megophryidae. It is endemic to northern Sichuan, China where it is found in Pingwu County and Mao County.
Its natural habitats are temperate forests and rivers. It is threatened by habitat loss.

References

chuanbeiensis
Endemic fauna of Sichuan
Amphibians of China
Taxonomy articles created by Polbot
Amphibians described in 1983
Endangered Fauna of China